STARD (Stohl Advanced Research and Development) is an auto racing team founded in 2016 by Austrian racing driver Manfred Stohl. The team supplies Ford Fiestas for the World Rallycross Championship and the Kia Cee'd for TCR-specification series. They are also developing the first electric rallycross cars.

Racing record

Complete FIA World Rallycross Championship results
(key)

Supercar

* Season still in progress.

References

External links
 Team website
Austrian auto racing teams
World Rallycross Championship teams
Austrian racecar constructors
European Rally Championship teams
World Rally Championship teams
Auto racing teams established in 2016